Zhenxiong County is a county in the northeast of Yunnan province, China, under the administration of Zhaotong prefecture and bordering Guizhou and Sichuan.

Geography
Zhengxiong County is located in the northeastern part of Yunnan province. It borders Xuyong County (Sichuan) to the east across the Chishui River, Hezhang County (Guizhou) to the south, Yiliang County to the west, and Weixin County to the north. The village of Delong in Potou Township is located near the triple intersection point of the three provinces, and is so nicknamed the "fowl cry of the three provinces".

Zhenxiong is located amongst the northern slopes of the Yunnan–Guizhou Plateau, with elevations increasing from northeast to southwest, although the central and southern areas are more level.

Climate

Administrative divisions
Zhenxiong County consists of 3 districts, 20 towns, 5 townships, 2 ethnic townships:

Demographics

Most people in Zhenxiong County speak Standard Chinese (commonly called "Mandarin"), which is used in the media, by the government, and as the language of instruction in education. A notable exception is the Yi people, who commonly speak the Yi language). The other significant minority group living in Zhenxiong County is the Miao people, who live at higher elevations in the county.

Economy
Zhenxiong possesses rich mineral resources (in total 30 species), including coal, pyrite, marble, and cryolite. Among them, coal and pyrite have a very wide distribution with richer reserves. The prospective reserves and industrial reserves of coal are 7.4 million tons and 4.517 million tons, respectively. The former accounts for 28.01% of provincial output, and the latter is about 17.1%.

Transport

Highways
The main road passing through Zhenxiong County is China Provincial Road  (302 Shengdao), which is a shengdao or shoudou, or provincial road.

From Zhenxiong County, it is roughly 320 km to Guiyang, 500 km to Chongqing, 535 km to Chengdu, 570 km to Kunming, 900 km to Nanning, 1200 km to Xi'an, 1220 km to Guangzhou, 1330 km to Shenzhen, 1570 km to Lanzhou, 1790 km to Xiamen, and 2250 km to Beijing.

Airports
Bijie Feixiong Airport , with flights to Beijing-Nanyuan, Chengdu, Chongqing, Guangzhou, Guiyang, Hangzhou, Kunming, Lanzhou, Nanning, Sanya, Shanghai-Hongqiao, Shenzhen, Xi'an, and Xiamen, is approximately 100 km by ground transport from Zhenxiong County.
Zhaotong Airport , with flights to Beijing-Nanyuan, Chengdu, Chongqing, Guiyang, and Kunming, is approximately 260 km by ground transport from Zhenxiong County.

References

External links
Zhenxiong County Official Site

County-level divisions of Zhaotong